Høgskavlen Mountain is a prominent, flattish, snow-topped mountain just northeast of Domen Butte in the Borg Massif of Queen Maud Land, Antarctica. It was mapped by Norwegian cartographers from surveys and air photos by the Norwegian–British–Swedish Antarctic Expedition (1949–52) and named Høgskavlen (the high snowdrift).

References

Mountains of Queen Maud Land
Princess Martha Coast